Jamnith, also Jabnith, Yavnit, Iamnia, or in medieval parlance, Ibnit / Abnit / Ovnit, is a ruin in the Upper Galilee that came to renown during the First Jewish Revolt in the 1st-century CE. The ruin, known locally by the name Khurbet esh-Sheikh Banit, or simply Kh. Access to the ruin is now restricted because of an enclosed military installation built over the site. 

The village is mentioned twice in the writings of Josephus as being in the Upper Galilee; once in The Jewish War (2.20.6) under the appellation Ἰαμνειθ, and again in Vita §37 under the name Ίαμνια, and is distinguished from the Jamnia of Judaea. Josephus testifies of himself that he assisted in building the wall of the village, the reference perhaps being to funding its building project. The hilltop fortress has no natural spring, suggesting that its inhabitants relied upon rock-cut cisterns for water, of which several can be found on the site.

The fate of the town's defenders is not known, but they are presumed to have surrendered after the fall of Tarichaea.

Victor Guérin visited the site in the late 19th-century and found on the plateau of the elevated hill, which he called Kharbet Benit, what he described as "a village, now overthrown from top to bottom, and of which there are only many piles of stones from demolished houses." Earlier, in 1838, the site was visited by Edward Robinson, who wrote, "here (Benit) are the slight remains of a former village, situated directly on the brow of the mountains enclosing the Huleh, and commanding a splendid view over the whole basin and the surrounding region."

Michael Avi-Yonah thought that the priestly course known as Bilgah had its place of residence in Yavnit.

Identification
While most modern historical geographers are unanimous as to Jamnith's identification with the ruin Kh. Banit, Edward Robinson and Eli Smith who surveyed the ancient sites of Palestine were uncertain of its location. Neubauer thought that the site of Jamnia in Galilee may have been identical with Yabneel of the Hebrew Bible, a place later known as Kefar Yammah. However, this last site is not in the Upper Galilee.

Jamnia, known as Ibnit, had been resettled by local Arabs as late as 1948.

Rabbinic burial ground
Jewish tradition holds that Talmudic scholars Abaye and Rava are buried in a cave shown on Har Yavnit (Ovnit). R. Yudan Nesi'ah, upon whom was conferred the title of nasi, is also said to have been buried on the mountain, along with his two sons. Visitors may access the burial sites as they lie outside the restricted area. The mountain affords a good prospect of the Hula valley on its east and southeastern side, including the town of Rosh Pina and the northern part of the Sea of Galilee.

Gallery

References

Bibliography

 
 
 
 
 
 
  
 
 

 
  (first printed in Leipzig 1907)

External links
 Survey of Western Palestine, Map 4:   IAA, Wikimedia commons

Geography of Israel
Archaeological sites in Israel
First Jewish–Roman War
Ancient Jewish settlements of Galilee
Former populated places in Israel
Upper Galilee
Geography of Palestine (region)
Geography of Northern District (Israel)